Pavli Terka born 1865 year to(Durrës and died to Corfu, 1943) was an Albanian state official and politician who served as Minister of Foreign Affairs in the Toptani Government.

Biography
Pavli Terka was born in the western port city of Durrës to a family with ties to the city's merchant elite. Prior to entering politics, he worked as a consular officer. On September 15, 1909, along with Haxhi Sulejmani and Jahja Ballhysa, he founded the patriotic club "Bashkimi" and took the role of deputy chairman. The club was established just days following the Congress of Dibër and worked to introduce written Albanian to the local idadiye school (gymnasium).

A few years later, Terka joined the orthodox eldership of Durrës and emerged as its leader. It was during this time when he acquainted himself with Essad Pasha Toptani who appointed him as  minister of foreign affairs in his newly formed cabinet. Terka accompanied Essad Pasha at the Paris Peace Conference in April 1919.

After leaving politics, Terka migrated with his family to the island of Corfu, Greece and became involved in the local trade. He died in 1943.

References

Government ministers of Albania
Foreign ministers of Albania
People from Durrës
Albanian politicians
1943 deaths